The 1969 NCAA University Division Wrestling Championships were the 39th NCAA University Division Wrestling Championships to be held. Brigham Young in Provo, Utah hosted the tournament at Smith Fieldhouse.

Iowa State took home the team championship with 104 points and three individual champions. 

Dan Gable of Iowa State received the Gorriaran Award as well as being named the Most Outstanding Wrestler.

Team results

Individual finals

References
1969 NCAA Tournament Results

NCAA Division I Wrestling Championship
NCAA
Wrestling competitions in the United States
NCAA University Division Wrestling Championships
NCAA University Division Wrestling Championships
NCAA University Division Wrestling Championships